The Cumberland Valley AVA is an American Viticultural Area located in Washington County in west-central Maryland and Franklin and Cumberland counties in south-central Pennsylvania.  Only  of the  included in the wine appellation are planted to grapevines, predominantly on high terraces over the Potomac River and on the slopes of South Mountain.  The soil in the area is alkaline limestone. The Cumberland Valley mainly has a hot-summer humid continental climate (Dfa) and is mainly in hardiness zone 6b with 7a at the ends. The AVA extends from the Potomac to the Susquehanna River.

References 

American Viticultural Areas
Geography of Cumberland County, Pennsylvania
Geography of Franklin County, Pennsylvania
Maryland wine
Pennsylvania wine
Geography of Washington County, Maryland
1985 establishments in Maryland
1985 establishments in Pennsylvania